The Muraka opened its doors in 2018 to become the Maldives, and the world's, very first underwater hotel suite. It is part of the Conrad Maldives Rangali Island Resort, owned by Hilton Worldwide. The two-story structure consists of an en-suite master bedroom, en-suite twin bedroom, sun deck and infinity pool on its upper floor and a double bedroom and en-suite bathroom in the underwater section. This bedroom has a curved acrylic glass ceiling and walls that allows guests to observe the sea life outside while its accompanying en-suite bathroom and walk-in closet have floor to ceiling glass sections.

A stay at The Muraka is an exclusive experience and guests can arrive directly via private seaplane from the airport or transfer by speedboat from the main resort. A stay also includes a private, on call speedboat, complimentary jet skis, a private butler and chef, on-call massage, spa treatments and a personal trainer.

In order to ensure that it doesn't move during bad weather, there are ten concrete piles holding it in place. The total cost of construction was $15 million.

The Muraka was designed by New York-based architect Yuji Yamazaki and local architect Ahmed Saleem.

References 

Hilton Hotels & Resorts hotels
Hotels in the Maldives
Undersea buildings and structures
Hotels established in 2018
2018 establishments in the Maldives